Sébastien Dufoor (born 7 July 1981) is a Belgian football striker.

References

1981 births
Living people
Belgian footballers
S.K. Beveren players
K.S.V. Roeselare players
F.C.V. Dender E.H. players
K.V.K. Tienen-Hageland players
RWS Bruxelles players
Belgian Pro League players
Challenger Pro League players
Association football forwards